Whale was a Swedish alternative rock group active from 1992 to 1999.

Career
Gordon Cyrus and Henrik Schyffert met while working on a commercial and decided to collaborate on a music track. Schyffert recruited his then-girlfriend, Cia Berg, to perform vocals. The band enjoyed some success, particularly in the European market. Their first single, 1993's "Hobo Humpin' Slobo Babe", was positively received by critics and received heavy spins in the Euro dance club scene and saturation airplay on MTV. It reached the Top 10 in Denmark and Norway, Top 30 in the Netherlands and Austria, Top 40 in Sweden,  and No. 24 on the US Modern Rock Tracks chart. It also reached No. 46 on the UK Singles Chart in 1994, and when reissued in 1995, reached No. 15.

The music video for "Hobo Humpin' Slobo Babe", directed by Mark Pellington, won the first MTV Europe Music Award for Best Video in 1994.

Whale toured with Tricky, Blur and Placebo.

In the late 1990s, the band's official website stated that their original name was Southern Whale Cult 1987, and that several albums had previously been released under that name. This was later admitted to have been a joke; the band had copied a presentation by the Cult and simply changed the name of the band in the text.

Whale disbanded after the 1999 single "Deliver the Juice", to little fanfare.

Post-breakup
Schyffert has enjoyed an extensive television and comedy career, while Cyrus has found success in international audiovisual marketing and design.

Discography

Studio albums
We Care (1995, Virgin Records/Hut Records)
All Disco Dance Must End in Broken Bones (1998, Virgin/Hut)

Singles and EPs

References

Swedish musical groups
Virgin Records artists
Musical groups disestablished in 1999
MTV Europe Music Award winners
English-language singers from Sweden
Female-fronted musical groups